Faurås Hundred was a hundred in Halland, Sweden.

It was composed of the following parishes: Alfshög, Fagered, Gunnarp, Gällared, Källsjö, Köinge, Ljungby, Morup, Okome, Stafsinge, Svartrå, Ullared and Vinberg in Falkenberg Municipality as well as Dagsås and Sibbarp parishes in Varberg Municipality

References

Hundreds of Halland